Kimberley Le Court de Billot (born 23 March 1996) is a South African-Mauritian professional racing cyclist, who currently rides for South African Efficient Infiniti Insure Pro MTB Ladies team. She represented Mauritius at the 2019 African Games in cycling and she won two medals: the gold medal in the women's cross-country marathon event and the bronze medal in the women's cross-country Olympic event.

Major results

2015
 African Games
1st  Road race
8th Time trial
2016
 1st  Road race, National Road Championships
 3rd  Road race, African Road Championships
2017
 2nd  Road race, African Road Championships
2018
 9th Road race, African Road Championships
2019
 African Games
1st  Cross-country marathon
3rd  Cross-country
6th Road race
 1st  Road race, National Road Championships
 8th Road race, African Road Championships
2022
 African Road Championships
1st  Mixed Relay TTT
2nd  Team time trial
 5th Cross-country, Commonwealth Games

See also
 List of 2016 UCI Women's Teams and riders

References

External links
 

1996 births
Living people
Sportspeople from Pretoria
South African female cyclists
Mauritian female cyclists
African Games medalists in cycling
African Games gold medalists for Mauritius
African Games bronze medalists for Mauritius
Competitors at the 2015 African Games
Competitors at the 2019 African Games
Cyclists at the 2018 Commonwealth Games
Commonwealth Games competitors for Mauritius
Cyclists at the 2022 Commonwealth Games